WCEE-LD is a low-powered television station in Charlotte, North Carolina, broadcasting on channel 17. It was formerly W16CF, an analog affiliate for TBN before going silent on February 27, 2014; the station went back on the air on October 23, 2014 as a digital affiliate of Estrella TV. The station’s transmitter is located near Reedy Creek Park in the Newell section of Charlotte.

Digital channel

References

External links

Low-power television stations in the United States
CEE-LD
CEE-LD